Toxidia peron, the large dingy skipper or dingy grass-skipper, is a butterfly of the family Hesperiidae. It is found in the Australian Capital Territory, New South Wales, Queensland and Victoria.

The wingspan is about 30 mm.

The larvae feed on Stenotaphrum secundatum, Gahnia sieberiana, Lomandra species, Dianella caerulea and other Dianella species.

External links
Australian Insects
Australian Faunal Directory

Trapezitinae
Butterflies described in 1824